Malek Awab is a Singaporean former footballer in the 1980s and 1990s. Malek Awab also once held the record for the most number of international caps for his country, Singapore (121 caps).

Football career

Club 
Malek played for the Kuala Lumpur FA side that won the Malaysia Cup in 1988.

International 
Malek was spotted by national coach Jita Singh and brought on to the national team on 13 October 1980.

Malek played in his first international game at King's Cup, Bangkok, 1980.

Representing the Lions in midfield, Malek was often seen running tirelessly for 90 minutes of the game, closing down on opposition players and making cutting runs into the opponents half. Together with Fandi Ahmad, Abbas Saad and V. Sundramoorthy, they formed the backbone of the Singapore team that won the Malaysia Cup in 1994.

Malek played his last international match during the 1996 Tiger Cup.

Coaching 
After retirement from professional football, Malek coaches children at the Kaki Bukit Sports Club.

Career 
Outside of football, Malek is a sales manager for Pacific Sports Private Limited since 1980s.

Personal life 
Malek is married to seamstress Sharifah Nazihah.

Honours
Singapore Lions
Malaysia Premier League: 1994
Malaysia Cup: 1980, 1994

See also
 List of men's footballers with 100 or more international caps

References

External links
Catching up with Malek Awab
JPT Talk - Featuring Malek Awab

1961 births
Living people
Singaporean footballers
Singapore international footballers
FIFA Century Club
Kuala Lumpur City F.C. players
Singapore FA players
Geylang International FC players
1984 AFC Asian Cup players
Footballers at the 1990 Asian Games
Association football midfielders
Southeast Asian Games silver medalists for Singapore
Southeast Asian Games bronze medalists for Singapore
Southeast Asian Games medalists in football
Competitors at the 1981 Southeast Asian Games
Asian Games competitors for Singapore